The Clam Lake Canal (sometimes called the Cadillac Canal) is a man-made 0.33 mile (0.53 km) long canal between Lake Mitchell and Lake Cadillac in Cadillac, Michigan. It was made by George A. Mitchell, the founder of the city of Cadillac (as the Village of Clam Lake), in the 1870s. The main purpose of the man-made canal was to facilitate the movement of logs to sawmills. Mitchell was a businessman, merchant, railwayman, lumber baron, and real estate developer who needed lumber to build the village, and saw the potential for further sawmill development.

The canal displayed an unusual mystery soon after it was constructed: it freezes over in the first part of the winter, when the lakes on each side of it are unfrozen. Then, when the adjacent lakes freeze over with thick ice, the canal in between thaws.

Background 
In 1873, George A. Mitchell paid $2,000 ($ today) to purchase a  strip of land between Little Clam Lake and Big Clam Lake. Little Clam Lake is now known as Lake Cadillac and Big Clam Lake is now known as Lake Mitchell, named after Mitchell's nephew and partner William W. Mitchell. The strip already connected these lakes via the easterly flowing Black Creek, which Mitchell envisioned as an efficient transportation route for logs once the canal was constructed. He dredged the creek, but it was inadequate for floating the harvested timbers from Big Clam Lake to Little Clam Lake and to his mills in Cadillac, so he went about constructing a new canal a few hundred feet south. He noted the prevailing westerly winds, and the natural flow of the water to the northeast corner of Little Clam Lake, that would work to his advantage. 

Mitchell first persuaded the Grand Rapids and Indiana Railroad to change their original route layout between the lakes, redirecting it to the eastern end of the Little Clam Lake, in the southeast corner of Wexford County, Michigan. He was a stockholder in the railroad company and a future director, and this helped his success. He then formed the Clam Lake Improvement and Construction Company with $10,000 in capital stock, and developed a canal. The main reason for the canal's development was to float logs from one lake to the other and collect fees for the usage of the waterway. The logs were then taken to the railroad and sawmills for processing into lumber.

Environment and current use 
In 1919, the area was reorganized as Mitchell State Park; the canal itself was dedicated as a Michigan State Historic Site on March 16, 1989.

They are both fishing lakes, as is the canal, because they have vegetation favorable for a fish environment. Lake Mitchell (Big Clam Lake) reportedly dropped by a foot soon after the canal was completed in 1873. Black Creek still exists and flows in both directions during periods of high water draining the eastern portion of the local marsh into Lake Mitchell and the western portion into Lake Cadillac.

The size of the Lake Mitchell drainage basin is over 28,000 acres and the lake flushes about once a year. One report classifies Lake Mitchell as a borderline meso-eutrophic lake and another report classifies it as eutrophic, although some of those parameters show as mesotrophic. The lake is primarily sand and organic matter, with a few areas of cobble stone and gravel. Although there is no dam or lake level control structure on the lake, there is a structure on Lake Cadillac that influences the level of Lake Mitchell.

Freezing phenomenon 
In the winter, Clam Lake Canal often displays an unusual phenomenon, described in Ripley's Believe It Or Not series. Unlike most canals in the Northern Hemisphere, the canal freezes over in the first part of the winter, when the lakes on each side are unfrozen. When the lakes freeze over in the mid-winter months, the canal then thaws and flows with unfrozen water.

In the early winter months, lighter water floats to the top; as the weather gets colder, water closest to the top freezes first.

See also
List of Michigan State Historic Sites in Wexford County

References

Sources

Further reading

External links 

Canals in Michigan
Michigan State Historic Sites
Bodies of water of Wexford County, Michigan
Protected areas of Wexford County, Michigan
Tourist attractions in Wexford County, Michigan
History of Michigan